Pablo Cuevas and Brian Dabul were the defending champions. Both are present, but chose not compete together this year.

Cuevas partnered up with Marcel Granollers, but they lost in the first round 2–6, 2–6, against Potito Starace and Horacio Zeballos. Dabul partnered up with Paolo Lorenzi, but they lost in the first round 1–6, 4–6, against Santiago González and Nicolás Massú.

The champions of this edition were Łukasz Kubot and Oliver Marach, who defeated in the final Potito Starace and Horacio Zeballos 6–4, 6–0.

Seeds

Draw

Draw

External links
 Main Draw Doubles

Chile Open (tennis)
Movistar Open - Doubles